Over 45 years, English guitarist and composer Robert Fripp has been extremely active as a recording musician and a producer. He has contributed to more than 700 official releases. The Robert Fripp Discography Summary, compiled by John Relph, also lists 120 compilations and 315 unauthorised releases (such as bootlegs). This means that more than 1100 releases (including both official and unofficial ones, as well as both studio and live recordings) can be found with Robert Fripp participating. A full list can be found at the location provided above. Major solo or collaborative releases under Fripp's name are listed here, see also King Crimson discography for the group that Fripp de facto leads.

Solo

Studio albums

Live albums

Giles, Giles and Fripp

Fripp & Eno

The League of Gentlemen

Robert Fripp & The League of Crafty Guitarists

David Sylvian & Robert Fripp

Travis & Fripp

Collaborative albums

Guest appearances

See also
 King Crimson discography
 Frippertronics
 Soundscapes by Robert Fripp

External links
 
 

Discography
Discographies of British artists
Rock music discographies
Electronic music discographies